is a Japanese politician and the current governor of Yamaguchi Prefecture in Japan. He was first elected in 2014, and re-elected in 2018.

References 

1972 births
Living people
People from Yamaguchi Prefecture
University of Tokyo alumni
Governors of Yamaguchi Prefecture